Dehdasht-e Gharbi Rural District is a rural district (dehestan) in the Central District of Kohgiluyeh County, Kohgiluyeh and Boyer-Ahmad Province, Iran. At the 2006 census, its population was 9,118, in 1,768 families. The rural district has 54 villages.

References 

Rural Districts of Kohgiluyeh and Boyer-Ahmad Province
Kohgiluyeh County